Isla Pond, is an island in the Gulf of California east of the Baja California Peninsula. The island is uninhabited and is part of the Mexicali Municipality.

Biology

Isla Pond has five species of reptile, including Aspidoscelis tigris (Tiger Whiptail), Crotalus ruber (Red Diamond Rattlesnake), Phyllodactylus nocticolus (Peninsular Leaf-toed Gecko), Sauromalus hispidus (Spiny Chuckwalla), and Uta stansburiana (Common Side-blotched Lizard).

References

http://herpatlas.sdnhm.org/places/overview/isla-pond/97/1/

Islands of Mexicali Municipality
Islands of Baja California
Islands of the Gulf of California
Uninhabited islands of Mexico